Jean Graton (10 August 1923 – 21 January 2021) was a French comic book author and cartoonist. Graton created the famous character Michel Vaillant and the eponymous series in 1957.

Biography
Graton was born in Nantes, France, in 1923. He moved to Brussels in 1947 and worked there in animation and advertising companies. He was hired by Spirou magazine in 1952, for which he illustrated Belles Histoires de l'Oncle Paul. Determined to create and draw his own characters, he got a job for Tintin magazine. From 1953, he published his own stories in Tintin. Some consisting of a few strips, and most related to sports and automobiles, were published in 1957 by Le Lombard in an album entitled Ca c'est du sport!.

In 1957, Graton created the character Michel Vaillant. Some short comics were published in Tintin and acquired huge popularity. As soon as 1959, a full album was published by Le Lombard. In 1966, Graton created the Les Labourdet series with his wife, Francine, and published it between 1967 and 1970 in the Chez Nous magazine. In 1972, he created Julie Wood, a character who starred first in her own series, then in the Michel Vaillant series. In 1982, Graton started, with his son Philippe Graton, his own publishing house, Graton Editeur. He launched, with Philippe Graton, the Dossiers Michel Vaillant series in 1995, each album of which being dedicated to a famous driver. In 2000, they created the Palmarès Inedit series, made up of comics that were drawn by Graton in the 1950s and 1960s, including the Labourdet series, as well as comics that had not been published before.

In 2004, Graton, at the age of 80, decided to retire and to stop drawing. His works are continued by Philippe Graton and the Studio Graton, which he created himself.

On 21 January 2021, Graton died in Brussels, Belgium, at the age of 97.

Graphic style

The huge popularity of Graton's series is partly due to their extreme realism. Graton's works, particularly the Michel Vaillant series, are notable for featuring real-life people, drivers, teams, races, and places. Graton is widely recognized as a great automobile and motorsport drawer. The several descriptions of places, circuits, and cars he gave in his series are highly well-documented, specific, and realistic. Graton used to take a lot of notes, illustrations, and photographs of the various automobile-related places he attended as an automobile-passionate. He was later assisted with this work by his son Philippe, who has a passion for photography.

Relation with motorsports

Graton's passion for motorsport went back to his childhood. Later in his life, he attended numerous Formula One and other motorsport races, and was acknowledged by famous drivers. His series inspired some drivers to choose such a career.

Awards
 In 1986, at the Morzine Avoriaz BD Festival, he received the "Le sport: Une œuvre, un Auteur" (Sport: A work, an author) award.
 In 1989, at the Belgian Bande Dessinée Festival at Han sur Lesse, he was rewarded by the president of the festival and the Belgian minister, Amand Dalem, a "prix spécial d'exception pour l'ensemble de son œuvre" (special prize for his whole work).
 In 2004, at the 19th Automobile Festival, he was given the "Grand Prix de l'Art" award.
 In 2005, he was named "Chevalier de l'Ordre de Léopold" by Belgium.

Bibliography
 Les Histoires vraies de l'Oncle Paul (24 stories, published in 12 albums, 1953–1954)
 Ça, c'est du sport! (1 album, 1957)
 Michel Vaillant (96 albums, 1959–2007)
 Les Labourdet (9 albums, 1967–2008)
 Un exploit de Michel Vaillant (1 album, 1972)
 Julie Wood (12 albums, 1976–1980)
 Dossiers Michel Vaillant (9 albums, 1995–2008)
 Palmarès inédit (6 albums, 2000–2006)

References

External links
 Michel Vaillant official page
 Jean Graton at Le Bedetheque 
 Jean Graton at BD Paradisio 
 Jean Graton Fan Club 
 Jean Graton at Lambiek

1923 births
2021 deaths
Artists from Nantes
Belgian comics artists
French comics artists
Michel Vaillant
Writers from Nantes